Baoris penicillata, the Paintbrush swift, is a species of butterfly belonging to the family Hesperiidae. It is found in India, Sri Lanka, Thailand, Malaysia, Myanmar, Vietnam, Laos, and recently from China.

Wingspan is about 32-38mm. Three subspecies recognized.
Baoris penicillata brenda Evans, 1937
Baoris penicillata chapmani Evans, 1937
Baoris penicillata unicolor Moore, 1883

References

Hesperiidae